Taking the Stage: African American Music and Stories That Changed America is a television special which first aired on January 11, 2017. The program was broadcast again in 2020.

The two-hour special documented the inaugural ceremony for the National Museum of African American History and Culture. It was filmed at the John F. Kennedy Center for the Performing Arts. Music, dance, and dramatic readings celebrated African-American contributions showcased in the new museum.

Notable attendees and performers included:
President Barack Obama and Michelle Obama
Patti Austin
Oprah Winfrey
Stevie Wonder
Quincy and Rashida Jones
Tom Hanks
Angela Bassett
Samuel L. Jackson
Will Smith and Jada Pinkett Smith
Gladys Knight
Jamie Foxx
Mary J. Blige
Usher
Christina Aguilera
John Legend
Herbie Hancock
Dave Chappelle
Savion Glover
Dave Grohl
Octavia Spencer
Ne-Yo
Doug E. Fresh
Chris Tucker

See also

 2017 in American television

References

External links
 Taking the Stage: African American Music and Stories That Changed America (2017) at IMDb

2017 in American television
2017 television specials